Žujince is a village located in the municipality of Preševo, Serbia. According to the 2002 census, the village has a population of 1248 people. Of these, 1189 (95.27%) were ethnic Albanians, 52 (4.16%) were Serbs, and 3 (0.24%) others.

References

Populated places in Pčinja District
Albanian communities in Serbia